David Mutinda Mutua (born 20 April 1992) is a Kenyan middle distance runner who specialises in the 800 metres.

Career 
At the 2010 World Junior Championships in Athletics in Moncton, Canada, Mutua won a gold medal over 800 metres.

Personal best

References

External links

1992 births
Living people
Kenyan male middle-distance runners
21st-century Kenyan people